Sergei Sergeyevich Bugriyev (born 16 March 1998) is a Russian football player. He plays for Spartak Kostroma.

Club career
He made his debut in the Russian Football National League for Zenit Saint Petersburg 2 on 16 July 2017 in a game against Dynamo Saint Petersburg.

On 23 January 2020 he signed a 1.5-year contract with Tom Tomsk.

On 16 August 2021, he joined Kazakhstan Premier League club Kyzylzhar.

References

External links
 
 
 Profile by Russian Football National League

1998 births
People from Karachay-Cherkessia
Sportspeople from Karachay-Cherkessia
Living people
Russian footballers
Association football defenders
Russia youth international footballers
FC Zenit-2 Saint Petersburg players
FC VSS Košice players
FC Tom Tomsk players
FC Kyzylzhar players
FC Vitebsk players
FC Spartak Kostroma players
2. Liga (Slovakia) players
Russian First League players
Russian Second League players
Kazakhstan Premier League players
Belarusian Premier League players
Russian expatriate footballers
Expatriate footballers in Slovakia
Russian expatriate sportspeople in Slovakia
Expatriate footballers in Kazakhstan
Russian expatriate sportspeople in Kazakhstan
Expatriate footballers in Belarus
Russian expatriate sportspeople in Belarus